Marin Oršulić (born 25 August 1987) is a Croatian footballer who most recently played as a defender for Seongnam FC in the K League 2.

Career
Previously he played for NK Zagreb where he was the youngest team captain in First Croatian League.

Khazar Lankaran
In the winter transfer window of 2012–13 season, Oršulić joined Azerbaijan Premier League side Khazar Lankaran on a two-year contract. On 26 July 2013, following a defeat to Maccabi Haifa in the 2nd Qualifying round of the 2013–14 UEFA Europa League, Oršulić and all the foreign player left Khazar Lankaran whilst still having 18 months to run on his contract.

CSKA Sofia
In July 2014, Oršulić signed a one-year contract with Bulgarian club CSKA Sofia.

Tromsø
Oršulić went to Norway Tippeligaen side Tromsø IL, and signed with them on 14 August 2015.

Seongnam FC 
On 3 Feb 2017, Seongnam FC announced their newest signing, Marin Oršulić.

References

External links
 

1987 births
Living people
Sportspeople from Metković
Association football central defenders
Croatian footballers
NK Zagreb players
Khazar Lankaran FK players
NK Zadar players
PFC CSKA Sofia players
Tromsø IL players
AC Omonia players
Seongnam FC players
Croatian Football League players
Azerbaijan Premier League players
First Professional Football League (Bulgaria) players
Eliteserien players
Cypriot First Division players
K League 2 players
Croatian expatriate footballers
Expatriate footballers in Azerbaijan
Croatian expatriate sportspeople in Azerbaijan
Expatriate footballers in Bulgaria
Croatian expatriate sportspeople in Bulgaria
Expatriate footballers in Norway
Croatian expatriate sportspeople in Norway
Expatriate footballers in Cyprus
Croatian expatriate sportspeople in Cyprus
Expatriate footballers in South Korea
Croatian expatriate sportspeople in South Korea